Jose Guerrero Valdez (born January 22, 1983) is a Dominican professional baseball pitcher. He played in Major League Baseball (MLB) for the Houston Astros in 2011 and 2012.

Career
Valdez was signed by the New York Yankees as an international free agent in 2000.  He signed with the Astros following the 2009 season and was placed on the 40-man roster. On October 18, 2011, he declared for free agency. However, he signed a minor league contract with the team on October 24.

Valdez signed a minor league deal with the Boston Red Sox in January 2014, playing in their farm system that season. After spending 2015 in the Mexican League, he did not play professionally in 2016. Having signed with them in 2017, he currently plays for the Toros del Este of the Dominican Winter League.

References

External links

1983 births
Living people
Battle Creek Yankees players
Charleston RiverDogs players
Corpus Christi Hooks players
Dominican Republic expatriate baseball players in Mexico
Dominican Republic expatriate baseball players in the United States
Gulf Coast Astros players
Gulf Coast Yankees players
Houston Astros players

Major League Baseball pitchers
Major League Baseball players from the Dominican Republic
Mexican League baseball pitchers
Oklahoma City RedHawks players
Pawtucket Red Sox players
Portland Sea Dogs players
Scranton/Wilkes-Barre Yankees players
Staten Island Yankees players
Sultanes de Monterrey players
Tampa Yankees players
Tigres del Licey players
Trenton Thunder players
Toros del Este players